Kung Fu Panda 2 is a 2011 American computer-animated martial arts comedy film produced by DreamWorks Animation and distributed by Paramount Pictures. The film is the sequel to Kung Fu Panda (2008) and the second installment in the Kung Fu Panda franchise. It was directed by Jennifer Yuh Nelson (in her feature directorial debut) and written by Jonathan Aibel and Glenn Berger. The film stars Jack Black, Angelina Jolie, Dustin Hoffman, Seth Rogen, Lucy Liu, David Cross, James Hong, and Jackie Chan reprising their character roles from the first film, with Gary Oldman, Michelle Yeoh, Danny McBride, Dennis Haysbert, Jean-Claude Van Damme, and Victor Garber voicing new characters. In the film, Po and his allies (Tigress, Monkey, Viper, Crane, and Mantis) travel to Gongmen City to stop the evil peacock Lord Shen from conquering China, while also rediscovering Po's forgotten past.

The film was released in theaters on May 26 in 2D, RealD 3D, and Digital 3D.  The Rotten Tomatoes critical consensus says it "offers enough action, comedy, and visual sparkle to compensate" for its familiar plot while also praising the performances of Black and Oldman. It grossed $665 million worldwide against its $150 million budget, becoming the highest-grossing film directed by a female director until Frozen (2013), as well as the highest-grossing film solely directed by a female director until Wonder Woman (2017). It is also the sixth highest-grossing film of 2011, and the highest-grossing animated feature film of the year. The film was nominated for the Academy Award for Best Animated Feature at the 84th Academy Awards, losing to Rango. Nelson became the second woman to be nominated for the Academy Award for Best Animated Feature, after Marjane Satrapi for Persepolis (2007). A sequel, Kung Fu Panda 3, was released in January 2016.

Plot
The peacock rulers of Gongmen City invented fireworks for peaceful purposes, but their son, Lord Shen, discovered that the gunpowder used in firecrackers could be used as a weapon. Worried by Shen's obsession, his parents visited a soothsayer, who told them that if he continued too far down this path, he would be stopped by "a warrior of black and white." Shen learned of the prophecy and deduced that the warrior would be a panda, leading his wolf army to massacre the local population. Horrified by the genocide, Shen's parents banished him. Many years later, Shen and his army raid villages for scrap metal, hoping to build cannons which Shen can use to conquer all of China.

Meanwhile, Po is enjoying his new role as a Kung Fu Master alongside the Furious Five, though Master Shifu warns him he has not yet achieved inner peace. When the leader of the wolf army raids another village, Po and the Five intercept him; however, a symbol on his armor gives Po a flashback of his mother. Po questions his father Mr. Ping, and the goose reveals that he found Po as an infant in a shipment of radishes outside his restaurant. When no one came forward to claim the cub, Mr. Ping adopted Po as his son. Po and the Five are dispatched across the sea to Gongmen City next, after learning Shen used a cannon to kill a regent of the city, Master Thundering Rhino. Shen imprisons the other regents, Masters Ox and Croc, and takes over the city. At Gongmen Palace, the city's goat soothsayer meets Shen and continually reminds him of the prophecy.

Upon arrival at Gongmen City, Po and the Five free Masters Ox and Croc, but the duo refuses to help, believing kung fu died with Master Rhino. Po and the Five feign surrender to Shen, with Master Mantis freeing the others from bondage. They destroy one of the cannons, but Po sees the same familiar symbol on Shen's plumage, which distracts him long enough for Shen to escape and destroy Gongmen Palace with his cannonade.

Once they are safe, Tigress demands answers, and Po reveals he has remembered Shen was there the day he last saw his biological parents. Tigress sympathizes, but fears Po's lack of focus will get him killed. The Five leave Po and proceed to Shen's cannon factory with the intent to blow it up. However, Po follows and confronts Shen, inadvertently spoiling the plan and allowing the Five to be captured. Shen lies and says Po's parents hated him, and shoots him with a cannon. Badly wounded but alive, Po floats downriver and is rescued by the soothsayer. She tells him about the panda genocide, and encourages him to embrace his past. Po, finally achieving inner peace, is able to recall that his father went down fighting, while his mother hid him in a radish crate and drew off Shen's army so he could survive.

Rejuvenated, Po returns to Gongmen City, where Shen is sailing downriver with his cannons and army. Po frees the Five, and with the help of Masters Ox, Croc, and Shifu, they are able to wreck the foremost ships and prevent the army from reaching the harbor. Lord Shen fires a cannon, killing some of his own soldiers, to clear the way. Po stands alone against Shen, using his newfound inner peace skills to deflect all the cannonballs shot at him back at the fleet, destroying it. Po offers mercy to Shen, but he rejects it and attacks Po with a spear. Shen accidentally severs the lines holding up one of the cannons, and it falls onto the ship, killing him. Po is congratulated by Shifu and the Five; returning to the Valley, Po reaffirms his identity as Mr. Ping's son, and his love for his adopted father. Meanwhile, at a secret panda village in the mountains, Po's biological father Li Shan is revealed to still be living, and senses his son is still alive.

Voice cast

 Jack Black as Master Po
 Liam Knight as Baby Po
 Angelina Jolie as Master Tigress
 Gary Oldman as Lord Shen
 Michelle Yeoh as Soothsayer
 Seth Rogen as Master Mantis
 Lucy Liu as Master Viper
 David Cross as Master Crane
 Jackie Chan as Master Monkey
 James Hong as Mr. Ping
 Dustin Hoffman as Master Shifu
 Dennis Haysbert as Master Storming Ox
 Jean-Claude Van Damme as Master Croc
 Victor Garber as Master Thundering Rhino
 Danny McBride as Wolf Boss
 Fred Tatasciore as Li Shan
 Lauren Tom as Market Sheep
 Conrad Vernon as Boar

Production
After the original Kung Fu Panda was released in June 2008, DreamWorks Animation planned a second film with the subtitle Pandamoneum, which was changed by 2010 to The Kaboom of Doom before simply being retitled to Kung Fu Panda 2. Jennifer Yuh Nelson, who was head of story for the first film, was hired to replace John Stevenson and  Mark Osborne as director for the sequel due to the fact that they wouldn't be returning for the sequel. The original film's cast members reprised their voice roles. Like every DreamWorks Animation film from Monsters vs. Aliens onward, Kung Fu Panda 2 was produced in DreamWorks' stereoscopic 3-D technology of InTru 3D.

Jonathan Aibel and Glenn Berger, screenwriters and co-producers for the first film, returned to write and co-produce the sequel, with Charlie Kaufman consulting on the screenplay early on in the development process.

In Kung Fu Panda 2, the production crew showed increased familiarity with Chinese culture. In 2008, after the release of Kung Fu Panda, DreamWorks CEO Jeffrey Katzenberg and other DreamWorks members, including production designer Raymond Zibach and director Jennifer Yuh Nelson, visited the city of Chengdu, which is considered as the "panda hometown". In addition to seeing real pandas at the Giant Panda Research Centre, the production designer crew members learned about the local culture. Katzenberg has stated that the sequel incorporates many elements of Chengdu in the film. The film's landscape and architecture also found inspiration from those found at Mount Qingcheng, a renowned Taoist mountain. In an interview with the China Daily, Zibach recounted that the Panda research center influenced the movie in a big way, as did their experience of holding a month old panda cub named A Bao, which gave the idea for baby Po in a flashback. It also gave them the idea of featuring Sichuan Food like Mapo toufu and Dandan noodles. In an interview with Movieline, Berger stated that "we never really thought of this as a movie set in China for Americans; it's a movie set in a mythical, universalized China for everyone in the world."

Release
Kung Fu Panda 2 was screened at the 2011 Cannes Film Festival in early May before its commercial release. In the United States, it premiered on May 22, 2011, at Grauman's Chinese Theatre, in Hollywood, California. The film was widely released in the United States and South Korea on May 26, 2011, in the United Kingdom on June 10, 2011, and in Australia on June 23, 2011. It was also released in IMAX theaters in the EMEA region.

Home media
The film was released on DVD and Blu-ray on December 13, 2011, accompanied by the short film Kung Fu Panda: Secrets of the Masters and an episode of the Kung Fu Panda: Legends of Awesomeness television series. As of February 2013, 6.5 million home entertainment units were sold worldwide.

Reception

Critical reception
The site's critical consensus reads, "The storyline arc may seem a tad familiar to fans of the original, but Kung Fu Panda 2 offers enough action, comedy, and visual sparkle to compensate." On Metacritic the film has a weighted average score of 67 out of 100 based on 34 critics, indicating "generally favorable reviews". Audiences polled by CinemaScore gave the film an "A" grade on an A+ to F scale.

Variety called the film "a worthy sequel that gets an extra kick from the addition of dynamic 3D fight sequences," while The Hollywood Reporter similarly praised the film. Roger Ebert gave the film 3.5 out of 4 stars, praising the sequel as superior to the original and as an ambitious extension of the previous story.

Some critics noted the influences of executive producer Guillermo del Toro's works in the film's darker themes, and Jim Tudor of TwitchFilm.net describes that with del Toro on board, the film "effectively probes deeper into Po's emerging hero's journey and personal issues, evoking a truly fulfilling Campbellian archetype, but also remains fully viable as mainstream entertainment suitable for all ages."

As with the first film, the animation has been praised. Frank Lovece of Film Journal International describes the film as "truly beautiful to behold" and states it "works on both aesthetic and emotional levels". Betsy Sharkey of the Los Angeles Times writes that "For Panda 2 is not just wall-to-wall animation, it is artistry of the highest order." Many critics praised Gary Oldman for his voice acting and developed characterization of Lord Shen, with some comparing him favorably to Ian McShane's voice performance as Tai Lung in the original film, with Angie Errigo of Empire Magazine calling him "fabulous as the feathered fiend and his character animators do his performance proud with a stunning, balletic fighting style, the fan tail flicking with lethal fascination." Kyle Smith of the New York Post said, "It's a bit hard to be terrified of a peacock (the snow leopard in the first movie was way more sinister). But the animators are in charge, and they succeed in dazzling with Lord Shen's look."

Box office
The film grossed $165.2 million in the United States and Canada, along with $500.4 million in other territories for a worldwide total of $665.7 million. In total, 3D contributed approximately 53% of the film's worldwide gross. Worldwide, it is the sixth highest-grossing film of 2011 and the 26th highest-grossing animated film. On its first weekend, it earned $108.9 million worldwide, ranking third behind Pirates of the Caribbean: On Stranger Tides and The Hangover Part II. It was the highest-grossing film directed by a woman until Frozen two years later, as the well as the highest-grossing film directed solely by a woman until Wonder Woman.

In North America, the film earned $5.8 million on its opening day (Thursday, May 26, 2011), ranking second behind The Hangover: Part II. On Friday, the film earned $13.1 million, which was behind the first film's $20.3 million opening Friday. Over the three-day weekend (Friday-to-Sunday), the film earned $47.7 million, which was behind the first film's $60.2 million debut and it finished second place at the box office behind The Hangover Part II. The film went on to make $13.2 million on Memorial Day, bringing its 4-day weekend to $60.9 million.

Outside North America, the film debuted with $55.5 million on the same weekend as its North American debut, topping the box office in nine out of eleven countries in which it was released. It ranked third overall behind Pirates of the Caribbean: On Stranger Tides and The Hangover Part II. The film topped the box office outside North America on two consecutive weekends (its third and fourth weekend).

In China, its highest-grossing market after North America, two different grosses were reported, one a $19.3 million two-day weekend and the other a $16.7 million two-day weekend. Either way, the film set an opening-day record in the country. It earned $93.19 million in total, making it the highest-grossing animated film released in China, surpassing previous record-holder Kung Fu Panda ($26 million). It held the record until 2015, when it was surpassed by the Chinese film Monkey King: Hero Is Back. The Asian-themed film scored the largest opening weekend for an animated film in Malaysia, the Philippines, Singapore, South Korea, and Thailand. It became the highest-grossing film released in Vietnam, surpassing Avatar.

Accolades

Marketing
DreamWorks Animation has invested  in creating promotional partners and building up marketing for its films. For Kung Fu Panda 2, DWA has partnerships with McDonald's, AT&T, Best Buy, General Mills (cereals), Sun-Maid (raisins), Airheads (candy), Hint Water, and HP. The film's characters are used in products and advertising campaigns across various media. The studio is also pursuing social media efforts to promote the film.

DWA partnered with House Foods America to brand its products, notably tofu, with advertising of the film. Variety reported that the partnership was the first-ever between a film studio and a tofu company. The studio also enlisted the parade balloon of Po from the Macy's Thanksgiving Day Parade to tour in six cities, concluding with Los Angeles over Memorial Day weekend in late May 2011.

Merchandise was also produced for the film: Fisher-Price (toys), THQ (video games), Hallmark (cards), and Jem Sportswear (apparel). Publishers VTech, Penguin Books, Dalmatian Press, and Ape Entertainment released books tied to the film.

Soundtrack

Kung Fu Panda 2 is the soundtrack of the film of the same name, collaboratively scored by Hans Zimmer and John Powell and originally released on May 24, 2011.

Video game

A video game adaptation of the film was developed by Griptonite Games and published by THQ on May 23, 2011. The game was released for PlayStation 3, Xbox 360, Wii, and Nintendo DS platforms. The plot takes place after the events of the film, and features Po and the rest of the Furious Five troubled by an evil group of Komodo dragon mercenaries. With the help of the other kung fu masters, Po has to uncover the plot behind this siege and put a stop to it.

Sequel

The sequel, Kung Fu Panda 3, was released on January 29, 2016. It was directed again by Jennifer Yuh Nelson, and was produced in co-production with the Chinese-American studio Oriental DreamWorks.

Notes

References

External links

Kung Fu Panda 2 production notes at Paramount Pictures archived from the original site on September 27, 2011

2011 films
2011 3D films
2011 animated films
2011 computer-animated films
2010s American animated films
American 3D films
American computer-animated films
American sequel films
American martial arts comedy films
Anime-influenced Western animation
Kung fu films
Annie Award winners
Films about giant pandas
Films directed by Jennifer Yuh Nelson
Kung Fu Panda films
Wuxia films
DreamWorks Animation animated films
IMAX films
Paramount Pictures films
Paramount Pictures animated films
Films scored by Hans Zimmer
Films scored by John Powell
Films with screenplays by Jonathan Aibel and Glenn Berger
Films set in Imperial China
2011 martial arts films
3D animated films
2011 directorial debut films
2011 comedy films
2010s English-language films
Animated films about revenge